In Greek mythology, Thyreus (Ancient Greek: Θυρέα means "porter") was a Calydonian prince as the son of King Oeneus and Althaea, daughter of King Thestius of Pleuron. He was the brother of Deianeira, Meleager, Toxeus, Clymenus, Periphas, Agelaus and Gorge. In some accounts, he was called as the "horse-taming" Pheres or as Phereus. When the war between the Curetes and the Calydonians broke out, Thyreus along with his brothers, including Meleager, all fell during the battle.

Notes

References 

 Antoninus Liberalis, The Metamorphoses of Antoninus Liberalis translated by Francis Celoria (Routledge 1992). Online version at the Topos Text Project.
 Apollodorus, The Library with an English Translation by Sir James George Frazer, F.B.A., F.R.S. in 2 Volumes, Cambridge, MA, Harvard University Press; London, William Heinemann Ltd. 1921. ISBN 0-674-99135-4. Online version at the Perseus Digital Library. Greek text available from the same website.
Hesiod, Catalogue of Women from Homeric Hymns, Epic Cycle, Homerica translated by Evelyn-White, H G. Loeb Classical Library Volume 57. London: William Heinemann, 1914. Online version at theio.com
 Gaius Julius Hyginus, Fabulae from The Myths of Hyginus translated and edited by Mary Grant. University of Kansas Publications in Humanistic Studies. Online version at the Topos Text Project.

Princes in Greek mythology
Aetolian characters in Greek mythology
Aetolian mythology